The Great North Run (branded the Simplyhealth Great North Run for sponsorship purposes) is the largest half marathon in the world, taking place annually in North East England each September. Participants run between Newcastle upon Tyne and South Shields. The run was devised by former Olympic 10,000 m bronze medallist and BBC Sport commentator Brendan Foster.

The first Great North Run was staged on 28 June 1981, when 12,000 runners participated. By 2011, the number of participants had risen to 54,000. For the first year it was advertised as a local fun run; nearly thirty years on it has become one of the biggest running events in the world, and the biggest in the UK. Only the Great Manchester Run and London Marathon come close to attracting similar numbers of athletes each year.

The 1992 edition of the race incorporated the 1st IAAF World Half Marathon Championships. The event also has junior and mini races attached with these being run the Saturday before the main race on the Newcastle Quayside. Martin Mathathi holds the current men's course record with his run of 58:56 in 2011. In 2019, Brigid Kosgei's women's course record of 64:28 bettered the previous mark by over a minute and was also the fastest ever half marathon by a woman; however, the course was not eligible for records. That same year, Mo Farah won a record sixth consecutive men's Great North Run.

Course
The Great North Run starts in Newcastle upon Tyne on the A167 road (the central motorway), on the edge of both the city centre and the Town Moor. The route heads east and south down the motorway section, around the eastern side of the city centre, then crosses the Tyne Bridge into Gateshead. It heads around the eastern side of Gateshead town centre, then at a roundabout turns east and heads down the A184 (the Felling Bypass) in the direction of Sunderland. After , the route turns off the A184 and heads north-east towards South Shields down the A194 (Leam Lane).  later, the route reaches the southern side of Jarrow and it turns east down the A1300 (John Reid Road). The route passes through the south of South Shields (through Harton and Marsden) until it reaches the seafront just over  later, where it turns north up the A183. The last mile (1.6 km) of the route runs along the seafront road to the finishing line at South Shields. All roads on the course are closed several hours before the race begins, however multiple vehicles including TV crews, emergency services, event staff, and a fleet of buses carrying participants' belongings are authorised to travel between Newcastle and South Shields on the closed course roads ahead of and following the participants.

History 

The run was devised by former Olympic 10,000 m bronze medallist and BBC Sport commentator Brendan Foster. Foster was inspired after running in the Round the Bays Race in New Zealand in 1979, and has built upon the Great North Run with a series of other Great Run road races.

The first Great North Run was staged on 28 June 1981, when 12,000 runners participated. By 2003, the number of participants had risen to 47,000. The 2011 event saw an announced field of 54,000. The number of finishers was 35,777 in 2007, the largest half marathon and the 13th largest running race that year. In 2014, the event had 41,615 finishers, making it the largest half-marathon in the world as certified by Guinness World Records in 2016.

For the first nine races, eight of them were held in June. Since 1990, the race has instead been held in the autumn, usually in September but occasionally in October instead. Since 1990, the earliest date the race has been held on is 7 September (2014) and the latest is 22 October (2000). Bupa was the title partner of the Great North Run from the early 1990s until 2014, one of Britain's longest ever sports sponsorship agreements. In 2015 Morrisons announced their sponsorship of the Great Run series. In November 2015, the Great Run Company announced it was searching for a new title sponsor which includes the Great North Run. The 2016 Great North Run was the first staging of the event without a title sponsor. Simplyhealth became the new lead sponsor for 2017.

Events

In 2004 a runner died (the eighth death in the event's then 24-year history).

The 2005 Great North Run was the twenty-fifth edition of the race. Events to mark the anniversary included the launch of the Great North Run Cultural Programme at the Sage Gateshead. The race was started by Mike McLeod, the winner of the inaugural race in 1981. During the race, four participants died en route to South Shields. An inquest into the four deaths from 2005 began on Monday 5 June 2006 at Gateshead Council Chambers. In subsequent events, more emergency service personnel were brought in to ensure there was adequate cover.

In spite of increased medical provision at the 2006 race, a man in his twenties died.

The 2007 Great North Run was held on 30 September and was started by former England and Newcastle United manager Sir Bobby Robson.  Kara Goucher defeated Paula Radcliffe in an impressive victory for the American.  Goucher's winning time was 1:06:57.

The 2008 Great North Run was held on 5 October and was started by former Prime Minister of the United Kingdom Tony Blair.

The 2009 Great North Run was held on 20 September and was started by the musician Sting.

The 2010 Great North Run was the 30th running of the event and was held on 19 September and was started by TV presenters Ant & Dec. The number of finishers (half marathon only) was 39,459.

The 2011 Great North Run took place on the morning of Sunday, 18 September 2011.  The race was started by World 5,000-metre champion Mo Farah.

In 2013 the 33rd Great North Run had 56000 participants, most of whom were raising money for charity. The elite races had Olympic Gold Medalists and World Champion long-distance runners participating including in the men's race, Mo Farah, Kenenisa Bekele and a regular supporter of the event, Haile Gebrselassie. Ethiopian Bekele won the men's event just ahead of Farah. Kenya's Priscah Jeptoo came first the women's race and multi Olympic Gold Medalist David Weir won the wheelchair event.

In 2014 the 34th Great North Run had 57000 participants, celebrated the 1 millionth runner to cross the finish line, and was the first to have a British man win in 29 years. Mo Farah completed the race in exactly 1 hour, while Mary Keitany completed in 1:05:39 seconds - surpassing the previous course record of 1:05:40 by 1 second, a record held by Paula Radcliffe. Tracey Cramond, who was raising money for Butterwick Hospices, was the 1 millionth person to complete the run, stating she was "gobsmacked" and that it was her "moment of fame". The Great North Run was the first International Athletics Association Event (IAAF) event in the world to reach such a milestone.

In 2015 a 58-year-old male runner died.

The 2020 Great North Run was cancelled due to the COVID-19 pandemic. The 2022 event will cancel its Junior and Mini events due to the death of Elizabeth II.

Past winners

Key:

Wheelchair race

See also
 Northeast of England

References

Results 
 Butler, Mark (2012-11-17). Great North Run Half Marathon. Association of Road Racing Statisticians. Retrieved on 2013-01-20.
 History and Tradition . Great Run. Retrieved on 2013-01-20.

External links 
 Official website

Half marathons in the United Kingdom
Sport in Newcastle upon Tyne
Sport in Tyne and Wear
Athletics competitions in England
1981 establishments in England
Recurring sporting events established in 1981
Annual sporting events in the United Kingdom
Annual events in England
Sport in South Shields